Antoine Franklin McColister (born May 11, 1988), better known by his stage name Ace Hood, is an American rapper. He was born in Port St. Lucie, Florida and raised in Deerfield Beach, Florida. He was signed to record producer DJ Khaled's label We the Best Music Group in 2008, in a joint-venture with Def Jam Recordings. 

He has released four studio albums with his most successful of which being Blood, Sweat & Tears (2011) and Trials & Tribulations (2013). The albums contained his highest-charting singles, "Hustle Hard" and "Bugatti" (featuring Future and Rick Ross), respectively. In 2016, McColister announced his departure from We the Best Music and is currently working as an independent artist.

Early life
Ace Hood was born in Port St. Lucie, Florida, and was raised by his mother, who is of Haitian origin, alongside his younger cousin Ty Barton Jr. in Deerfield Beach, part of Broward County. He graduated from Deerfield Beach High School. Following a football injury in the 10th grade, and after realizing he wouldn't be able to go pro, the Broward County native began to seriously consider rapping as a career. Hood teamed up with a local group called Dollaz & Dealz and released a single titled "M.O.E." in 2006. He also began promoting himself via open mic events and talent shows around town.

Career

2006–2008: Career beginnings and Gutta

In 2007, he met DJ Khaled outside the office of the WEDR 99 Jamz radio station. After Hood gave Khaled an autobiography and his demo tape, Khaled asked Hood to do a freestyle over the instrumental of his song "I'm So Hood" from his second album, We the Best, and later signed Hood to his We the Best Music Group label. Hood was named, along with several others, on the Freshmen of '09 by XXL magazine.

His first album, Gutta, was released in 2008. Singles included "Cash Flow" featuring T-Pain and Rick Ross, and "Ride" featuring Trey Songz. Hood also released mixtapes called Ace Won't Fold and All Bets On Ace. He made a guest performance among several rappers on DJ Khaled's single "Out Here Grindin'", also featuring Akon, Rick Ross, Plies, Lil Boosie and Trick Daddy, which peaked at number 38 on the Billboard Hot 100. 

It is from Khaled's third studio album We Global, and was eventually certified gold by the RIAA. Ace Hood appeared on Wildstyle Radio on WUAG 103.1FM in Greensboro, North Carolina, on September 7, 2008, to promote his album, Gutta, along with DJ Khaled.  The album debuted at number 36 on the Billboard 200, selling 25,000 copies its first week.

2009–2012: Ruthless and Blood, Sweat, & Tears
On June 30, 2009, seven months later, Hood released his second album, titled Ruthless, once again on Def Jam. The album's first single was "Overtime", which was produced by The Runners and featured Akon and T-Pain. The album's second single is "Loco Wit The Cake", which was produced by Schife, of the Palm Beach County Karbeen Mafia. The album's guest list includes Rick Ross, Ludacris, Jazmine Sullivan, The-Dream, Birdman, and Lloyd.  The album debuted at number 23 on the Billboard 200, selling 20,000 copies its first week.

Hood confirmed that his third album will be called, Blood, Sweat & Tears. It was released on August 9, 2011. The first official single, "Hustle Hard", became Ace's highest charting solo single, peaking at number 60 on the Billboard Hot 100. The second official single is "Go 'N' Get It". Both tracks are produced by Lex Luger. The third single is "Body 2 Body" featuring Chris Brown and the song is produced by J.U.S.T.I.C.E. League. It peaked at number 65 on the Hot 100. The album features artists like T-Pain, Yo Gotti, Kevin Cossom, Rick Ross & Lil Wayne. The album debuted at number 8 on the Billboard 200, selling 26,000 copies, becoming the rapper's most successful album so far. He promoted the album with his first concert tour, the Hustle Hard Tour. He also appeared on three tracks from DJ Khaled's fifth studio album, We the Best Forever: "I'm Thuggin'", "Future", and the "Welcome to My Hood (Remix)".

Hood started 2012 by collaborating with Cash Money Records artist Bow Wow on a song called "We Going Hard". He will be appearing on Maybach Music's Self Made Vol. 2 album. Birdman and DJ Khaled signed Hood and We The Best Music Group to Cash Money Records. Hood will be recording his fourth studio album under We The Best and Cash Money Records. He has made guest appearances on tracks by other recording artists such s Talib Kweli, Jadakiss, Brisco, and "The Drill" by The Game, also featuring Meek Mill, which appears on his California Republic.

2013–present: Trials & Tribulations
For his debut single on the We The Best & Cash Money label, he reunited with Trey Songz after 4 years, to make the early-2000s-styled love single known as "I Need Your Love". Hood released his mixtape Starvation 2 on January 10, 2013. The mixtape features guest appearances from Meek Mill, French Montana and Plies. On January 16, 2013, Hood announced his fourth studio album titled Trials & Tribulations and released the first single from the album titled "Bugatti" featuring Future and Rick Ross. The song is produced by Mike WiLL Made It. 

On February 6, 2013, the music video was released for "Bugatti" featuring Future and Rick Ross. The song made a hot-shot debut on the Hot R&B/Hip-Hop Songs chart at number 42. "Bugatti" has since peaked at number 33 on the Hot 100, becoming Hood's most successful single to date as a lead artist, and his first top 40 hit since "Out Here Grindin'". On February 19, 2013, it was announced that Trials & Tribulations would be released on July 16, 2013.

On April 7, 2013, in an interview on Power 99 Philly with Mina SayWhat about his "Trials and Tribulations" album, Hood opens up about his family and deciding to go a different route with this album, working with Anthony Hamilton and John Legend and plans to get Lil Wayne and Kendrick Lamar to feature on the album too. On May 6, 2013, Hood released the remix to "Bugatti" featuring guests DJ Khaled, Future, Meek Mill, T.I., Wiz Khalifa, Birdman, French Montana and 2 Chainz. On June 5, 2013, Hood released the second  single called "We Outchea" featuring his Cash Money label-mate Lil Wayne. On June 26, 2013, the final track listing was revealed featuring appearances from Meek Mill, Anthony Hamilton, Chris Brown and Betty Wright.

Hood released his Starvation 3 mixtape on January 17, 2014. The free project included features from We The Best label-mates Vado and Mavado, as well as Betty Wright and Kevin Cossom. Production for the mixtape came from Cool & Dre, The Renegades, StreetRunner, and The Beat Bully, among others. Body Bag 3 was released on August 29. Two months after that, Hood would team up with Rich Homie Quan for a return single titled "We Don't".

In 2021, He joined Love & Hip Hop: Miami.

Personal life
Ace Hood is a Christian and states that he "highly believe[s] in God".

Hood and his previous girlfriend, Shanice Tyria Sarratt, had twin girls, Lyric and Sailor Blu McColister, on May 25, 2011. Lyric died shortly after birth due to health complications. He also has a son.
He proposed to longtime girlfriend Shelah Marie in April 2019; they got married on February 7, 2020.

Discography

 Gutta (2008)
  Ruthless (2009)
 Blood, Sweat & Tears (2011)
 Trials & Tribulations (2013)
 Mr. Hood (2020)
 M.I.N.D. (Memories Inside Never Die) (2022)

Awards and nominations

References

External links
 

Living people
African-American male rappers
Cash Money Records artists
Republic Records artists
Def Jam Recordings artists
Deerfield Beach High School alumni
People from Deerfield Beach, Florida
People from Port St. Lucie, Florida
Rappers from Florida
Southern hip hop musicians
Gangsta rappers
21st-century American rappers
21st-century American male musicians
African-American Christians
1988 births
21st-century African-American musicians
20th-century African-American people
American rappers of Haitian descent